The 2018 World Team Table Tennis Championships were held in Halmstad, Sweden from 29 April to 6 May 2018.

The quarterfinal between North Korea and South Korea in the women's tournament did not take place, as the teams choose to continue as a united team

Seeding
The top fourteen teams of the first division and the top two teams of the second division at the 2016 World Team Championships were guaranteed a place in the first division, along with top eight placed teams in the world rankings not already qualified.

Medal summary

Medal table

Medalists

See also
2018 ITTF World Tour
2018 ITTF World Tour Grand Finals
2018 ITTF Team World Cup
2018 ITTF Men's World Cup
2018 ITTF Women's World Cup

References

External links
Official website
ITTF website

 
World Table Tennis Championships
Table tennis competitions in Sweden
Sports competitions in Halmstad
World Team Table Tennis Championships
World Team Table Tennis Championships
World Team Table Tennis Championships
World Team Table Tennis Championships
World Team Table Tennis Championships